Turnaly (Tornalı) is a rural locality (a selo) and the administrative centre of Turnalinsky Selsoviet, Salavatsky District, Bashkortostan, Russia. The population was 819 as of 2010. There are 7 streets.

Geography 
Turnaly is located 26 km northeast of Maloyaz (the district's administrative centre) by road. Yelgildino is the nearest rural locality.

References 

Rural localities in Salavatsky District